The IIM Kozhikode Society & Management Review is a double blind peer reviewed journal on business management and broader society. It is published twice a year by SAGE Publications (New Delhi) in association with Indian Institute of Management Kozhikode. This journal is a member of the Committee on Publication Ethics (COPE).

Abstracting and indexing 
IIM Kozhikode Society & Management Review is abstracted and indexed in:
 DeepDyve
 J-Gate

External links 
 
 Homepage

References 

 http://publicationethics.org/members/iim-kozhikode-society-and-management-review=COPE 
 

SAGE Publishing academic journals
Publications established in 2012
Business and management journals